Ochus may refer to:

Mochus, e.g. in Diogenes Laertius
King Darius II of Persia, originally called Ochus
King Artaxerxes III of Persia, originally called Ochus
Ochus, son of Darius III of Persia
An old name for the Panj River
Ochus (butterfly), a genus of butterflies in the grass skipper family